El Reno tornado may refer to:

The 2011 El Reno–Piedmont tornado, a long-track EF5 tornado that passed near El Reno and other communities west and north of Oklahoma City
The 2013 El Reno tornado, the widest tornado on record, which passed south and east of El Reno, Oklahoma
The 2019 El Reno tornado, a brief EF3 tornado which struck southern parts of El Reno